The Lake Moondarra Fishing Classic is an annual fishing tournament held at Lake Moondarra in Mount Isa, Queensland, Australia. It is held in the last full weekend of October starting on the Friday afternoon and concluding on Sunday.

The event is hosted by the Mount Isa Fish Stocking Group, a non-profit volunteer organisation whose primary focus is the development of fresh water recreational fishery in the lakes around Mount Isa.

Funds raised from the event are used to stock the lakes with barramundi and sooty grunter fingerlings.

History

The Lake Moondarra Fishing Classic was spawned by the Mount Isa Fish Stocking Group to encourage keen anglers and the community to utilize the local lakes for recreational and entertainment purposes.

The first competition was held on the weekend of December 12, 1999. Four hundred and fifty seven (457) competitors and 208 fish weighed in with the biggest being a 3.62 kilogram catfish - the current record is a 26 kilogram barramundi.

The event was moved to October following year.

Categories
 Junior Male Secret Weight Runner Up
 Junior Male Secret Weight Winner
 Junior Female Secret Weight Runner Up
 Junior Female Secret Weight Winner
 Senior Male Secret Weight Runner Up
 Senior Male Secret Weight Winner
 Senior Female Secret Weight Runner Up
 Senior Female Secret Weight Winner
 Mystery Weight Archer Fish
 Mystery Weight Barra
 Mystery Weight Catfish
 Mystery Weight Longtom
 Mystery Weight Sleepy Cod
 Mystery Weight Sooty Grunter
 Junior Overall Mystery Weight

References

External links
 Mount Isa Fish Stocking Group

North West Queensland
Fishing tournaments
Sports competitions in Queensland
Recreational fishing in Australia
Annual events in Australia
Spring (season) events in Australia